Alexander Cox, also known as Alex Cox, is a Dutch field hockey coach and a former field hockey player. He guided SV Kampong to the 2015–16 Euro Hockey League title and two successive Hoofdklasse titles in 2016–17 and 2017–18. He has also worked as an assistant coach with both the Netherlands men's and Netherlands women's teams. He was head coach of the Netherlands U21 team that won the 2017 Men's EuroHockey Junior Championship. Between 2018 and 2019, Cox served as head coach of the Ireland men. He is married to Marsha Marescia, the former South Africa women's international.

Playing career
Cox played as a defender with Schaerweijde. Between 2003 and 2006 he played for SCHC in the Hoofdklasse.

Coaching career

Early years
Between 2006 and 2008 Cox the men's coach at Schaerweijde. In 2008 he took over from Paul van Ass at HGC in the Hoofdklasse. Between 2009 and 2011 he coached the Laren women's team in the Women's Hoofdklasse.

Netherlands 
Cox worked as an assistant coach with both the Netherlands men's and Netherlands women's teams at the 2012 Summer Olympics when they won silver and gold medals respectively. He was head coach of the Netherlands U21 team that won the 2017 Men's EuroHockey Junior Championship.

SV Kampong
In 2012 Cox was appointed head coach of the men's team at SV Kampong. With a team that included David Harte, he subsequently guided SV Kampong to the 2015–16 Euro Hockey League title and two successive Hoofdklasse titles in 2016–17 and 2017–18. In January 2020 he announced he would quit coaching at the end of the 2019–20 season to focus on his social life.

Ireland
In July 2018 Cox was appointed head coach of Ireland. He subsequently took charge of the Ireland team at the 2018 Men's Hockey World Cup and at the 2019 Men's EuroHockey Nations Championship. In August 2019 he resigned as Ireland head coach.

Personal life
In January 2013 Cox married Marsha Marescia, the former South Africa women's international and SV Kampong player.

Honours

Coach
SV Kampong
Euro Hockey League
Winners: 2015–16
Runners up: 2017–18
Hoofdklasse
Winners: 2016–17, 2017–18
Runners up: 2014–15, 2018–19
Netherlands U21
EuroHockey Junior Championship
Winners: 2017
Ireland
Men's FIH Series Finals
Runners up: 2019 Le Touquet

References

1978 births
Living people
Dutch male field hockey players
SCHC players
Men's Hoofdklasse Hockey players
Male field hockey defenders
Dutch field hockey coaches
HGC coaches
Ireland men's national field hockey team coaches
People from Zeist
SV Kampong
Sportspeople from Utrecht (province)